2017 in paleoentomology is a list of new fossil insect taxa that were described during the year 2017, as well as other significant discoveries and events related to paleoentomology that were scheduled to occur during the year.

New taxa

Coleopterans

Dermapterans

Dictyopterans

Dipterans

Hemipterans

Hymenopterans

Mecopterans

Neuropterans

Odonatans

Trichopterans

Other insects

General research
 A study on the diversity of insect herbivory on fossil angiosperm leaves from the Miocene Hindon Maar fossil lagerstätte (Otago, New Zealand) is published by Möller et al. (2017).
 A study on the wing pad joints in several specimens of Carboniferous palaeodictyopteran insect nymphs, and their implications for the origin of insect wings, is published by Prokop et al. (2017).
 An exceptionally preserved specimen of the early mantis species Santanmantis axelrodi, providing new information on the morphology of members of the species, is described from the Lower Cretaceous Crato Formation (Brazil) by Hörnig, Haug & Haug (2017).
 A redescription of the Eocene thrips species "Heterothrips" dietrichi Schliephake (2003) is published by Ulitzka & Mound (2017), who transfer this species to the genus Merothrips.
 A planidium, tentatively attributed to the order Strepsiptera, is described from the Late Cretaceous (Santonian) amber recovered from the Kheta Formation (Taymyr Peninsula, Russia) by Kathirithamby et al. (2017).
 Several permineralised axes of the conifer wood Ningxiaites specialis with preserved beetle borings and beetle remains are described from the Permian (Changhsingian) Sunjiagou Formation (China) by Feng et al. (2017).
 Peris et al. (2017) describe gymnosperm pollen preserved with a specimen of the false blister beetle species Darwinylus marcosi from the Cretaceous amber from Spain, and interpret the finding as indicating that false blister beetles originally were pollinators of gymnosperms (most likely cycads) before transitioning onto angiosperm hosts.
 Diverse fungivorous rove beetles belonging to the subfamily Oxyporinae are described from the Cretaceous Burmese amber by Cai et al. (2017).
 A redescription of the cryptophagid genus Nganasania from the Cretaceous Taimyr amber (Russia) is published by Lyubarsky & Perkovsky (2017).
 A study on the anatomy of the tracheal system of Saurophthirus longipes and its implications for the life cycle of the species is published by Rasnitsyn & Strelnikova (2017).
 A restudy of the fossils of the Triassic (Norian) species Archebittacus exilis is published by Lambkin (2017), who confirms that this taxon is an early hangingfly.
 New specimens of the mecopteran species Burmomerope clara (a male and a well-preserved female), providing new information on the anatomy of the species, are described from the Cretaceous Burmese amber by Soszyńska-Maj et al. (2017).
 A rhopalosomatid larva attached to a cricket is described from the Cretaceous Burmese amber (Myanmar) by Lohrmann & Engel (2017).
 A study on the phylogenetic relationships of the fossil ant Leptomyrmex neotropicus is published by Barden, Boudinot & Lucky (2017).
 Four pupae of assassin flies (likely representatives of the subfamily Laphriinae) are described from a single piece of amber (most likely of Baltic origin) by Haug et al. (2017).
 A study on the caddisfly cases from the Cretaceous (Berriasian-Hauterivian) Shinekhudag Formation (Mongolia) is published by Adiya et al. (2017), who find evidence that the Cretaceous caddisflies used, among other things, plant fragments, ostracod valves and carbonate rocks to construct larval cases, and argue that the bioherms of the Shinekhudag Formation developed as a result of symbiosis of caddisfly larvae and microbialites.
 A female of the alderfly species Haplosialodes liui is described for the first time from the Cretaceous Burmese amber by Liu et al. (2017).
 A review of the fossil record and early evolution of five groups of brachyceran flies, discussing their probable ecological associations with early flowering plants, is published by Zhang & Wang (2017).

References

2017 in paleontology
Paleoentomology
2017 in science